Poland competed at the 2023 Winter World University Games in Lake Placid, United States, from 12 to 22 January 2023.

The flagbearer at the opening ceremony was Marek Kania.

Medalists

Competitors 
At the 2023 Winter World University Games will participate 55 athletes. 7 of them also competed at the 2019 Winter Universiade.

External links
 https://lakeplacid2023-results.microplustimingservices.com/#/nation-schedule/POL

References 

Nations at the 2023 Winter World University Games
2023
Winter